Are you there Moriarty? is a parlour game in which two players at a time participate in a duel of sorts.  Each player is blindfolded and given a rolled up newspaper (or anything that comes handy and is not likely to injure) to use as a weapon.  The players then lie on their fronts head to head with about three feet (one metre) of space between them – or in other versions hold outstretched hands, or stand holding hands as in a handshake. The starting player says "Are you there Moriarty?".  The other player, when ready, says "Yes".  At this point the start player attempts to hit the other player with his newspaper by swinging it over his head.  The other player then attempts to hit the starting player with his newspaper.  The first player to be hit is eliminated from the game and another player takes his place.  The objective of the game is to remain in the game as long as possible.

There is a small amount of strategy to the game.  In order to avoid being hit, each player may roll to one side or the other.  The decision of which direction to roll, or whether to roll at all often determines whether the player is hit by his opponent.  A player who can quickly roll out of the way after speaking or striking will have a definite advantage in the game.  However, like most parlour games, the appeal of this game largely lies in its spectacle and humor rather than its strategy.

Media
The playing of this game is depicted in the David Nicholls novel One Day and in the 2011 movie based on the book.  Are you there, Moriarty? was played as a round of the QI series N Christmas special.

References 

Games of physical skill